Bernard of Valence (died 1135) was the Latin Patriarch of Antioch from 1100 to 1135.

Originally from Valence, Bernard was part of the army of Raymond of Saint-Gilles and attended the Battle of Harran, and Battle of Sarmada with Roger of Salerno. He was also Bishop of Artah. After Roger of Salerno was killed in the Battle of Ager Sanguinis, King of Jerusalem Baldwin II placed Bernard at the head of the government of the Principality of Antioch.

References

11th-century births
1135 deaths
Latin Patriarchs of Antioch
Christians of the First Crusade
Crusades chaplains